Latvia will compete at the 2009 World Championships in Athletics from 15–23 August. A team of 15 athletes, 12 men and 3 women, was announced in preparation for the competition.

Team selection

Track and road events

Field and combined events

References

External links
Official competition website

Nations at the 2009 World Championships in Athletics
World Championships in Athletics
Latvia at the World Championships in Athletics